Palomena viridissima is a European species of shield bug in the tribe Nezarini.

Gallery

References 

Hemiptera of Europe
Insects described in 1761
Nezarini
Taxa named by Nikolaus Poda von Neuhaus